Pascoea angustana is a species of beetle in the family Cerambycidae. It was described by Kriesche in 1923.

References

Tmesisternini
Beetles described in 1923